Events in the year 1985 in Belgium.

Incumbents
 Monarch: Baudouin
 Prime Minister: Wilfried Martens

Events
 15 January – Communist Combatant Cells (CCC) bomb the Federation of Belgian Enterprises, killing two firemen and wounding others.
 3 February – Roger Vangheluwe consecrated as bishop of Bruges by Cardinal Godfried Danneels
 16 to 21 May – Pope John Paul II visits Belgium
 29 May – Heysel Stadium disaster
 15 September – Ayrton Senna wins the 1985 Belgian Grand Prix at Spa-Francorchamps
 27 September – Brabant killers carry out armed robberies in Braine-l'Alleud and Overijse, killing eight.
 8 October to 5 November – CCC firebomb a series of companies
 13 October – General elections
 9 November – Brabant killers carry out an armed robbery in Aalst, killing eight.
 6 December
 CCC attack NATO pipeline in Wortegem-Petegem
 Liège law court bombing

Publications
 T. Luykx and M. Platel, Politieke geschiedenis van België van 1944 tot 1985 (2 vols., Antwerp, Kluwer).

Art and architecture
Films
 Hugo Claus (dir.), De Leeuw van Vlaanderen
 Nicole Van Goethem (dir.), A Greek Tragedy

Births
 5 January – Bart Goossens, footballer 
 1 February – Tim De Meersman, footballer
 5 February – Tatiana Silva, beauty queen
 15 February – Sara Peeters, cyclist
 16 March – Saskia Bricmont, politician
 20 June – Dieter Vanthourenhout, cyclist
 5 August – Joeri Calleeuw, cyclist 
 14 September – Stijn Neirynck, cyclist
 25 September – Nicolas Achten, musician
 10 October – Dominique Cornu, cyclist
 5 December 
 Mehdi Dehbi, actor and theatre director
 Nico Verdonck, racing driver
 22 December – Aurora Marion, actress

Deaths
 2 February – Lucien Cooremans (born 1899), politician
 18 July – Louisa Ghijs (born 1902), actress
 17 June – Pieter De Somer (born 1917), scientist
 10 October – Alice Melin (born 1900), politician
 29 October – Alice Roberts (born 1906), actress
 16 November – Léon Lampo (born 1923), athlete
 9 December – François Morren (born 1899), athlete
 15 December – Jean van den Bosch (born 1910), diplomat

References

 
1980s in Belgium
20th century in Belgium
Events in Belgium
Deaths in Belgium